Gandhinagar-lakshmipuram is 3rd grade municipality in thiruvannamalai UA, constructed in the year 2002 from the former gandhinagar special grade town panchayat and laskmipuram area carved out from the thyagi annamalai nagar town panchayat of thiruvannamalai UA.
Many new peoples considers Gandhinagar is the part of thiruvannamalai city but it only serves as a part of Thiruvannamalai UA.It spreads out on the Tindivanam and Pondicherry(via:villupuram & vettavalam)roads of thiruvannamalai UA.

Demographics
In 2001 gandhinagar has population of 30 thousand and in 2002 after joining of lakshmipuram {population :11000] it was totally 41000. Gandhinagar have a population of over 36 thousand and lakhmipurm have more than 15000 people totally this town having population of over 51000  providing sub urban to Tiruvannamalai urbanity. it comes under Tiruvannamalai urban agglomerations on Pondicherry Road NH 66 and Villupuram Road NH 234. There are two railway stations for Gandhinagar: one is "Gandinagar-Lakshmipuram"  and another is  Old Gandinagar  at Villupuram - Pondicherry  railway route.

References

External links

Cities and towns in Tiruvannamalai district

ta:காந்தி நகர் (திருவண்ணாமலை)
zh:加恩迪纳加尔